Xalatala (also, Kavahchol, Khalatala, and Kovakhchel’) is a village and municipality in the Balakan Rayon of Azerbaijan. It has a population of 2,731.  The municipality consists of the villages of Xalatala and Göyrücük.

Notes

References 

Populated places in Balakan District